Thomas of Sutton (died after 1315) was an English Dominican theologian, an early Thomist.

He was ordained as deacon in 1274 by Walter Giffard, and joined the Dominicans in the 1270s; he may have been a Fellow of Merton College, Oxford before that. He became doctor of theology in 1282.

Works
He wrote a large number of works, in some of which he opposed Duns Scotus.

The following works are among those authored by him:
Commentarium in IV sententiarum libros
Contra pluralitatem formarum
De productione formae substantialis
Liber propugnatorius contra I Sent. Duns Scoti
Super IV librum Sent. Duns Scoti
Contra Quodlibeta Joh. Duns Scoti
Contra librum primum et quartum commentarii Oxoniensis Johannis Duns Scoti
Contra I-III lib. Sent. Roberti Cowton
Impugnat. Aegidium Romanum
De ente et essentia
Quaestiones disputatae
Quaestiones ordinariae
Quodlibeta
Sermones

References
Pierre Mandonnet (editor) (1927), Contra pluralitatem formarum
B. Hechich (1958), De Immaculata Conceptione Beatae Mariae Virginis secundum Thomas de Sutton O.P. et Robertus Cowton O.F.M. 
Johannes Schneider (ed.) (1977), Thomas de Sutton, Quaestiones ordinariae, Bayerische Akademie der Wissenschaften.
P. Osmund Lewry, Two Continuators of Aquinas: Robertus de Vulgarbia and Thomas Sutton on the Perihermeneias of Aristotle, Mediaeval Studies 43 (1981), 58-130.
G. Prouvost, Thomas de Sutton contre Gilles de Rome. La question de l'être: le conflit des interprétations chez les premiers thomistes (XIIIe-XIVe s.), Revue Thomiste 95 (1995), 417-429. 
Mark D. Gossiaux, Thomas of Sutton and the Real Distinction between Essence and Existence, Modern Schoolman 83 (2006), 263-84.

Notes

External links
 List of works

De Natura accidentis (attribution uncertain), online Latin text
De instantibus (attribution uncertain), online Latin text
FAITANIN, Paulo, “O princípio de individuação segundo Tomás de Sutton.”, Aquinate, n°. 15, (2011), 66-89.

13th-century English Roman Catholic theologians
Scholastic philosophers
English Dominicans